A rochet is a white vestment generally worn by a Roman Catholic or Anglican bishop in choir dress. It is unknown in the Eastern churches. The rochet in its Roman form is similar to a surplice, except that the sleeves are narrower. In its Anglican form it is a descendant of the traditional albs worn by deacons and priests. In the Roman Catholic tradition, the rochet comes below the knee and its sleeves and hem are sometimes made of lace; in the Anglican tradition, the rochet comes down almost to the hem of the cassock and its sleeves are gathered at the wrist.

The word stems from the Latin rochettum (from the late Latin roccus, connected with the Old High German roch, roc and the A.S. rocc; Dutch koorhemd, rochet, French rochet, German Rochett, Chorkleid, Italian rocchetto, Spanish roquete), means an ecclesiastical vestment.

Catholic use 
In the Catholic Church, cardinals, bishops and certain other dignitaries use a rochet, a garment that is worn over the cassock for non-eucharistic functions.

The Catholic rochet is a tunic of white, usually fine linen or muslin (batiste, mull) reaching about to the knee, and distinguished from the surplice mainly by the narrower sleeves which make its arms tight-fitting, and is frequently trimmed with lace. The lower edge and the sleeves may also be garnished with lace, lined with violet or red silk in the case of prelates, or more rarely with embroidered borders.

The rochet is proper to, and distinctive of, prelates and bishops, but the right to wear it is sometimes granted by the pope to others, especially the canons of cathedral churches. It is not a vestis sacra, and cannot therefore be used as a substitute for the surplice, e.g. in the administering of the Sacraments (Decree of the Congregation of Rites of January 10, 1852). Nonetheless, since it is used at choir services and is ordered to be worn over the everyday dress at Mass (Missa rom. Rit. celebr. i. 2), it may be included among liturgical vestments in the widest sense. It is worn instead of a surplice by Canons Regular as part of their habit for liturgical use alone.

The earliest notice of the use of the rochet is found in an inventory of the vestments of the Roman clergy, dating from the 9th century. In this it is called camisia, a name which it retained at Rome until the 14th century, and it seems to have been already at that time proper to particular members of the clergy. Other Roman names for the vestment were succa, sucta; it was not till the 14th century that the name rochettum appeared at Rome, but it was not long before it had superseded all the native designations.

Outside Rome, too, the vestment is early met with, e.g. in the Frankish empire (9th century) as alba clericalis, in contrast to the liturgical alb, and in England (10th century) under the name of oferslip in the 46th canon of the ecclesiastical laws of Edgar. At the beginning of the 12th century the rochet is mentioned, under the name of camisia, by Gilbert of Limerick and by Honorius, and, somewhat later, by Gerloh of Reichersperg as tunica talaris. From the 13th century onward it is frequently mentioned. The name rocheltum is first traceable in England; in Germany and northern France the rochet was also called sarohi (Latinized sarrotus) or sarcos (Latinized sarcotium).

Outside Rome the rochet was, until well into the 14th century, a vestment common to all the clergy, and especially to those of the lower orders; and so it remained, in general, until the 16th century, and even, here and there, so late as the 19th. Moreover, in further contrast to the Roman use, it had, especially in the German dioceses, a liturgical character, being used instead of the surplice.

The rochet was originally a robe-like tunic, and was therefore girdled, like the liturgical alb. So as late as 1260 the provincial synod of Cologne decreed that the vestis camisialis must be long enough entirely to cover the everyday dress. A good example of the camisia of the 12th century is the rochet of Thomas Becket, preserved at Dammartin in the Pas de Calais, the only surviving medieval example remarkable for the pleating which, as was the case with albs also, gave greater breadth and more elaborate folds. In the 15th century the rochet only reached halfway down the shin; in the 16th and 17th to the knee; in the 18th and 19th often only to the middle of the thigh.

In the Middle Ages it was always plain.

Anglican use 

In the Anglican churches the rochet is a vestment peculiar to bishops and is worn by them in choir dress with the chimere, both in ministration in church and also on ceremonial occasions outside, e.g. sitting in the House of Lords, attending a royal levee, or commencement ceremony. It may be worn with a stole, cope and mitre for more dignified occasions (such as Baptism outside the context of the Eucharist, Solemn Evensong, royal weddings and the coronation of the Sovereign).

In general it has retained the medieval form more closely than the Roman rochet and more resembles the alb, insofar as it is of plain, very fine linen, and reaches almost to the feet. Where the Roman rochet is descended from the surplice, the rochet in its Anglican form is equal to that of the earlier style albs worn by priests. The main modifications have been in the (usually) baggy 'lawn' sleeves that are gathered at the wrists with a band of black or scarlet cloth. At the time of the Reformation these were still narrow, though already showing a tendency to expand. The portrait of Archbishop Warham at Lambeth, for instance, shows a rochet with fairly wide sleeves narrowing towards the wrists, where they are confined by fur cuffs. This fashion continued until, in the 17th century, the sleeves became much fuller; only in the 18th century did they develop into the familiar exaggerated balloon shape, confined at the wrists by a ribbon, beyond which a ruffle projected. About the same period, too, arose the custom of making the rochet sleeveless and attaching the lawn sleeves to the chimere. This remained the fashion most of the 19th century, but there has since been a tendency to revert to the earlier less exaggerated form, and the sleeves have been reattached to the rochet. The ribbon by which the wrist is confined is red, except when conducting or participating in a formal, public funeral (e.g. of a head of state), when it is black.

The rochet is worn without the chimere under the cope by those bishops who use this vestment. At his consecration the bishop-elect is, according to the rubric, presented to the consecrating bishops vested in a rochet only; after the laying on of hands he retires and puts on the rest of the episcopal habit; i.e. the chimere.
 
One exception to the normal Anglican-style is the rochet worn by the previous Archbishop of Canterbury, Rowan Williams which has open-ended narrow sleeves in the manner of the Roman rochet.

References

Sources 
 

Catholic clerical clothing
Anglican vestments
Lutheran vestments
History of clothing (Western fashion)
History of fashion
Gowns